Pride of Performance (Urdu: تمغۂ حسنِ کارکردگی) is a civil award given by the Government of Pakistan to Pakistani citizens in recognition of distinguished merit in the fields of literature, arts, sports, medicine, or science for civilians.

1980

1981

1982

1983

1984

1985

1986

1987

1988

 Most of the nomination process of the Pride of Performance Awards was cancelled due to the change of Government in 1989.

1989

References

Civil awards and decorations of Pakistan